John Farquhar may refer to:

 John Farquhar (gunpowder dealer)  (1751–1826), British arms dealer, briefly owner of Fonthill Abbey
 John Farquhar (American football) (born 1972), American football tight end
 John Farquhar (Australian cricketer) (1887–1977), Australian cricketer
 John Farquhar (Scottish cricketer) (1904–1984)
 John Farquhar (footballer) (born 1924), Scottish footballer
 John McCreath Farquhar (1832–1918), United States Representative from New York and recipient of the Medal of Honor
 John Hanson Farquhar (1818–1873), United States Representative from Indiana
 J. N. Farquhar (John Nicol Farquhar, 1861–1929), Scottish missionary in India